Skylink is a satellite service that offers Czech and Slovak TV and radio stations to residents of Slovakia and the Czech Republic. The package includes channels received without subscription and pay-TV channels.

A number of HDTV channels were introduced into the package in 2009, and Skylink claimed to have 500,000 subscribers from Slovakia and the Czech Republic, but by the end of the 2009, Skylink had 900,000 subscribers. Furthermore by April 2010, Skylink has reached 1,000,000 subscribers. Skylink is part of M7 Group (Canal+ Luxembourg S.a.r.l.) which since september 2019 is part of Canal+/Vivendi.

The Skylink package is broadcast from Astra 3A at 23.5° east.

References

External links
Skylink website (Czech Republic)
Skylink website (Slovakia)
SES guide to receiving Astra satellites
SES guide to channels broadcasting on Astra satellites
HDTV on Astra satellites

Companies of Slovakia
Television in Slovakia
Television in the Czech Republic
Companies based in Prague
Companies based in Bratislava
Telecommunications companies established in 2007
Czech brands
Telecommunications companies of the Czech Republic
M7 Group